Moreiria is a genus of parasitic flies in the family Tachinidae. There are at least two described species in Moreiria.

Species
These two species belong to the genus Moreiria:
 Moreiria maura Townsend, 1932
 Moreiria wiedemanni Toma & Guimaraes, 2001

References

Further reading

 
 
 
 

Tachinidae
Articles created by Qbugbot